The 33rd New Zealand Parliament was a term of the New Zealand Parliament. It was elected at the 1960 general election on 26 November of that year.

1960 general election

The 1960 general election was held on Saturday, 26 November.

Sessions
The 33rd Parliament sat for four sessions (there were two sessions in 1963), and was prorogued on 25 October 1963.

Ministries
Keith Holyoake formed the second Holyoake Ministry on 12 December 1960, which stayed in power until Holyoake stepped down in early 1972. The second National Government remained in place until its defeat at the  towards the end of that year.

Overview of seats
The table below shows the number of MPs in each party following the 1960 election and at dissolution:

Notes
The Working Government majority is calculated as all Government MPs less all other parties.

Initial composition of the 33rd Parliament

By-elections during 33rd Parliament
There were a number of changes during the term of the 33rd Parliament.

Notes

References

33